Odontura is the scientific name of two genera of organisms and may refer to:

Odontura (fungus) – a genus of fungi in the family Odontotrematacea
Odontura (katydid) – a genus of bush crickets or katydids in the family Tettigoniidae subfamily Phaneropterinae